Piedmont is a city primarily in Canadian County, Oklahoma, United States, though a small part of it is in Kingfisher County. It is a part of the Oklahoma City Metropolitan Area. The population was 5,720 at the 2010 census, a 56.7 percent increase from 3,650 in 2000. Piedmont is a home rule city served by a council–manager government.

History 
The city of Piedmont was founded on land claimed during the Unassigned Land Run of April 22, 1889. The town was founded in 1903 by Dr. E. H. Long.

Piedmont's success was spurred by the now-defunct St. Louis, El Reno and Western Railway that extended a line from Guthrie to El Reno, which allowed it to become an agricultural market center. However, the railroad ceased to operate in 1924.

Piedmont remained a small but stable rural community for the first half of the 20th century. Starting in the 1970s, the town became an increasingly popular bedroom community for those working in nearby Oklahoma City. Development of the "Northwest Expressway" (Oklahoma State Highway 3) resulted in population growth of 124%.

2011 tornado 
On May 24, 2011, Piedmont and surrounding areas were struck by the 2011 El Reno–Piedmont tornado. Rated EF5, it destroyed about 180 homes in the city, caused over $20 million in property damage, and killed two children.

Geography 
Piedmont is located in the northeastern corner of Canadian County at  (35.670849, -97.751903). It is bordered to the south by the Oklahoma City limits.

Demographics 

Piedmont also has many plains and has many crops growing, meaning many farmers.

As of the census of 2010, there were 5,720 people in 1,836 households in the city.  The population density was 83.3 people per square mile (32.2/km2). There were 1,270 housing units at an average density of 29.0 per square mile (11.2/km2). The 2010 racial makeup of the city was 87.7% white, 1% African American, 3.4% Native American, 0.07% Asian, and 3.7% from two or more races. Persons of Hispanic or Latino origin were 4.8% of the population. Census 2000 numbers list 1,226 households, out of which 49.3% had children under the age of 18 living with them, 78.4% were married couples living together, 7.2% had a female householder with no husband present, and 11.6% were non-families. 9.9% of all households were made up of individuals, and 2.8% had someone living alone who was 65 years of age or older. The average household size was 2.98 and the average family size was 3.18.

In the city, the population was spread out, with 31.3% under the age of 18, 6.4% from 18 to 24, 32.5% from 25 to 44, 23.2% from 45 to 64, and 6.4% who were 65 years of age or older. The median age was 35 years. For every 100 females, there were 99.6 males. For every 100 females age 18 and over, there were 97.3 males.

The median income for a household in the city was $85,313 from 2006 to 2010 and the median income for a family was $57,121. Males had a median income of $37,273 versus $26,332 for females. The per capita income for the city was $33,694. About 4.0% of families and 4.4% of the population were below the poverty line, including 4.6% of those under age 18 and 1.4% of those age 65 or over.

Education

The Piedmont school district reports an enrollment of 4,823 students for the 2021–2022 school year. Piedmont's school district consists of 7 school facilities: Early Childhood Center, 3 Elementary Schools, Intermediate School, Middle School, and High School. School teams are known by the nickname "Wildcats."

Piedmont High School won the Class C girls basketball State Championship in 1967.

The Pride of Piedmont Winter Guard won a MAPAA State Championship in 2006. In 2009, they won the WGPO State Championship. In 2010, the Pride of Piedmont Middle School Winter Guard won the state championship in their class. In 2017 The Piedmont High School Varsity Winter Guard Placed 2nd in their class.

The Piedmont Girls' Track Team won the Class 4A State Championship in 2009 and 2010.

The Piedmont Boys' Cross Country Team won the Class 5A State Championship in 2018, setting a state record in the process.  This also marks the school's first state championship for any boys' sport.

The Piedmont Girls' Basketball Team won the Class 5A State Championship in 2019.

The Piedmont Girls’ Softball team won the Class 5A State Championship game in 2019, defeating Carl Albert HS. It was the first Softball state championship in school history.  The Piedmont Softball team also won the Class 5A State Championship in 2021, defeating Coweta HS.

The Piedmont Marching Band won the Class 5A State Grand Championship at the OBA competition in 2021 with their show "Door 13".

Government
Piedmont is a home rule city served by a council–manager government.  Jason Orr was the City Manager from July 2016 until August 2021 when he was fired by the City Council as the result of an investigation by the Oklahoma State Auditor and Inspector.  The report revealed that Orr had violated Piedmont ordinances with the purchase of two pickup trucks by not obtaining prior Council approval and soliciting competitive bids as required.  The report also revealed the shocking revelation that Orr had contacted City Council members via phone calls prior to the purchase in February 2020 which appeared "to be an action of the Council conducted outside of an official meeting, a circumvention of the Open Meetings Act".  No action was ever taken against the Council members for their actions.

Josh Williams has been the City Manager since June 2022.  Kurt Mayabb was the Mayor from April 2019 to November 2023.  Former Mayor Pro-tem Melissa Ashford is the current Mayor until the term expires in April 2023.

Media 
Piedmont and nearby communities are served by the Piedmont-Surrey Hills Gazette.

References

External links
 City of Piedmont official website
 Piedmont community website
 Piedmont Citizen newspaper
 Piedmont-Surrey Gazette newspaper
 Piedmont Chamber of Commerce
 Piedmont Public Schools
 Oklahoma Digital Maps: Digital Collections of Oklahoma and Indian Territory

Oklahoma City metropolitan area
Cities in Canadian County, Oklahoma
Cities in Kingfisher County, Oklahoma
Cities in Oklahoma